David Barsamian (born 1945) is an Armenian-American radio broadcaster, writer, and the founder and director of Alternative Radio, a Boulder, Colorado-based syndicated weekly public affairs program heard on some 250 radio stations worldwide.

Barsamian started working in radio in 1978 at KGNU in Boulder, Colorado and then KRZA in Alamosa, Colorado.

Articles by (and interviews with) Barsamian have appeared regularly in The Progressive, The Sun and Z Magazine. Barsamian also lectures on U.S. foreign policy, corporate control, the media, and propaganda.

As a writer, Barsamian is best known for his series of interviews with Noam Chomsky, which have been published in book form and translated into many languages.

Deportation from India
On 23 September 2011, Barsamian was deported from India. After arriving on a flight at the Indira Gandhi International Airport he was refused entry and placed on a return flight. Barsamian attributes this to his reportage on human rights abuses in Jammu and Kashmir.

Bibliography

Filmography

See also
List of Armenian Americans

References

External links
About David Barsamian, with list of programs featuring him, at Alternative Radio's website
Alternative Radio (Australia) website
Statement of protest South Asia Citizens Web, Sep 28, 2011

American alternative journalists
American radio journalists
American people of Armenian descent
American anti-war activists
American anti–Iraq War activists
American male writers
Writers from Boulder, Colorado
1945 births
Living people